Miloš Kostadinović (born 2 December 1988) is a Serbian handball player for Dinamo Pančevo.

Career
Kostadinović started out at Železničar Niš, before transferring to Partizan in July 2009. He later played abroad in Belarus (Meshkov Brest) and Romania (CSM București and Steaua București).

At international level, Kostadinović represented Serbia at the 2012 European Men's Handball Championship, winning the silver medal.

Honours
Partizan
 Serbian Handball Super League: 2010–11, 2011–12
 Serbian Handball Cup: 2011–12
 Serbian Handball Super Cup: 2009, 2011, 2012

References

External links
 EHF record

1988 births
Living people
People from Bor, Serbia
Serbian male handball players
RK Partizan players
Expatriate handball players
Serbian expatriate sportspeople in Belarus
Serbian expatriate sportspeople in Romania